Vitor Ishiy (born 22 September 1995) is a Brazilian table tennis player. He competed in the 2020 Summer Olympics for Brazil.

References

External links
 

1995 births
Living people
Brazilian male table tennis players
Olympic table tennis players of Brazil
Table tennis players at the 2020 Summer Olympics
21st-century Brazilian people